Phrynomedusa marginata, the bicolored leaf frog, is a species of frog in the subfamily Phyllomedusinae.
It is endemic to Brazil. Its natural habitats are subtropical or tropical moist lowland forests, rivers, and intermittent rivers. It is threatened by habitat loss.

References

Phrynomedusa
Endemic fauna of Brazil
Amphibians described in 1976
Taxonomy articles created by Polbot